Ayesha Giulia Kapur (born 13 September 1994) is an Indian-German actress, who is best known in the Bollywood movie Black. Kapur became the recipient of many Awards in the "Best Supporting Actress" category. In doing so, she became the second youngest (behind Darsheel Safary) person to be both nominated and win a Filmfare Award and is currently the youngest person ever to win a Zee Cine Award and an IIFA Award.

Personal life
Kapur grew up and resides in Auroville, Puducherry. Her mother Jacqueline is German, and her father is Punjabi businessman Dilip Kapur, owner of the Hidesign chain of leather goods stores. She has one brother, Milan, and two half-brothers from her father's first marriage, Akash and Vikas. She grew up speaking English, German and Tamil, and also speaks Hindi. Kapur did her schooling from Deerfield Academy and graduated from the Columbia University in 2020.

Career
Kapur starred in her first major role in Bollywood in the 2005 movie Black, as the young Michelle McNally opposite Rani Mukerji and Amitabh Bachchan. She received praises and critical acclaim for her role. For her role, Kapur won the Filmfare Award for Best Supporting Actress (2006) at the 51st Filmfare Awards and she holds the record for the youngest nominee and winner of the award in the female category. Kapur's second movie was Sikandar in 2009 where she played the role of a young Kashmiri Muslim girl, Nasreen opposite the lead Parzan Dastur, with whom she develops a bond and becomes his conscience keeper.

Since 2010, Kapur along with her mother Jacqueline, also runs her own brand of accessories, Ayesha Accessories.

Filmography

Awards

References

External links
 
 

Living people
1994 births
Actors from Düsseldorf
Actresses from Puducherry
Auroville
Indian film actresses
Indian child actresses
German film actresses
German child actresses
Punjabi people
Indian people of German descent
German people of Punjabi descent
German people of Indian descent
Actresses in Hindi cinema
Filmfare Awards winners
Zee Cine Awards winners
International Indian Film Academy Awards winners
Screen Awards winners
German emigrants to India
European actresses in India
Actresses of European descent in Indian films
Deerfield Academy alumni
Columbia University alumni
21st-century German actresses
21st-century Indian child actresses
21st-century Indian actresses